Chariton County is a county located in the north-central portion of the U.S. state of Missouri. As of the 2020 census, the population was 7,408. Its county seat is Keytesville. The county was organized November 16, 1820, from part of Howard County and is named for the Chariton River.

History

Chariton County was settled primarily from the states of the Upper South, especially Kentucky and Tennessee. They brought slaves and slaveholding traditions with them, and they quickly started cultivating crops similar to those in Middle Tennessee and Kentucky: hemp and tobacco. Chariton was one of several counties settled mostly by southerners to the north and south of the Missouri River. Given their culture and traditions, this area became known as Little Dixie and Chariton County was at its heart. It was heavily pro-Confederate during the American Civil War.

Geography

Adjacent counties
Linn County (north)
Macon County (northeast)
Randolph County (east)
Howard County (southeast)
Saline County (southwest)
Carroll County (west)
Livingston County (northwest)

Major highways
 U.S. Route 24
 Route 5
 Route 11
 Route 129
 Route 139

National protected area
Swan Lake National Wildlife Refuge

Demographics

As of the census of 2000, there were 8,438 people, 3,469 households, and 2,345 families residing in the county.  The population density was 11 people per square mile (4/km2).  There were 4,250 housing units at an average density of 6 per square mile (2/km2).  The racial makeup of the county was 95.99% White, 3.19% Black or African American, 0.17% Native American, 0.13% Asian, 0.11% from other races, and 0.41% from two or more races. Approximately 0.56% of the population were Hispanic or Latino of any race. 38.8% were of German, 25.5% American, 9.7% English and 7.8% Irish ancestry.

There were 3,469 households, out of which 28.40% had children under the age of 18 living with them, 58.30% were married couples living together, 6.50% had a female householder with no husband present, and 32.40% were non-families. 29.80% of all households were made up of individuals, and 17.30% had someone living alone who was 65 years of age or older.  The average household size was 2.38 and the average family size was 2.94.

In the county, the population was spread out, with 23.70% under the age of 18, 6.50% from 18 to 24, 23.70% from 25 to 44, 23.80% from 45 to 64, and 22.30% who were 65 years of age or older.  The median age was 42 years. For every 100 females there were 91.90 males.  For every 100 females age 18 and over, there were 91.30 males.

The median income for a household in the county was $32,285, and the median income for a family was $39,176. Males had a median income of $25,263 versus $19,068 for females. The per capita income for the county was $15,515.  About 8.80% of families and 11.60% of the population were below the poverty line, including 11.40% of those under age 18 and 14.00% of those age 65 or over.

2020 Census

Education

Public schools
Brunswick R-II School District – Brunswick
Brunswick Elementary School (PK-06)
Brunswick High School (07-12)
Keytesville R-III School District – Keytesville
Keytesville Elementary School (PK-06)
Keytesville High School (07-12)
Northwestern R-I School District – Mendon
Northwestern Elementary School (PK-06)
Northwestern High School (07-12)
Salisbury R-IV School District – Salisbury
Salisbury Elementary School (K-06)
Salisbury High School (07-12)

Private schools
St. Joseph School – Salisbury (K-09) – Roman Catholic

Public libraries
Brunswick Area Library  
Dulany Memorial Library  
Keytesville Public Library

Politics

Local

State

Chariton County is split between two districts in the Missouri House of Representatives, with both electing Republicans.

District 39 – Joe Don McGaugh (R-Carrollton). Consists of the northern part of the county. 

District 48 – Dave Muntzel (R-Boonville). Consists of the southern part of the county. 

All of Chariton County is a part of Missouri's 18th District in the Missouri Senate and is currently represented by Cindy O'Laughlin (R-Shelbina).

Federal

All of Chariton County is included in Missouri's 6th Congressional District and is currently represented by Sam Graves (R-Tarkio) in the U.S. House of Representatives.

Missouri presidential preference primary (2008)

Former U.S. Senator Hillary Clinton (D-New York) received more votes, a total of 786, than any candidate from either party in Chariton County during the 2008 presidential primary. She also received more votes than the total number of votes cast in the entire Republican primary in Chariton County.

Communities

Cities and Towns

Brunswick
Dalton
Keytesville (county seat)
Marceline
Mendon
Rothville
Salisbury
Sumner
Triplett

Unincorporated Communities

 Bynumville
 Cunningham
 Forest Green
 Guthridge
 Hamden
 Indian Grove
 Lagonda
 Lewis Mill
 Louisville
 Mike
 Musselfork
 Newcomer
 Prairie Hill
 Rockford
 Shannondale
 Snyder
 Westville
 Wien

Former Settlement

 Fort Orleans

Notable people
Jane Hadley Barkley—former 2nd Lady of the U.S., wife of Alben Barkley. (Keytesville)
 Walt Disney—Film producer, animator, business leader. (Marceline)
 John Donaldson -- Negro league baseball pitcher. Known for pitching a large number of no-hitters. (Glasgow)
 J. William Fulbright—Longtime U.S. Senator and namesake of the Fulbright Scholarship. (Sumner)
Cal Hubbard, -- Pro Football Hall of Fame member and former Major League Baseball umpire. (Keytesville)
 Vern Kennedy—Former Major League Baseball pitcher. (Mendon)
 Darold Knowles—Former MLB relief pitcher. First pitcher to ever appear in all seven games of a World Series. The baseball field at Brunswick R-II school is named in his honor. (Brunswick)
 Wayne E. Meyer—U.S. Navy admiral, "Father of the Aegis weapons system". (Brunswick)
 W. James Morgan—Union Army officer, responsible for the Burning of Platte City during the American Civil War. (Brunswick)
 Floyd B. Parks -- U.S. Marine aviator who earned the Navy Cross posthumously for his actions leading Marine fighter squadron VMF-221 during the Battle of Midway. (Salisbury)
Sterling Price, - 11th Governor of Missouri. Confederate General in the Civil War (Keytesville)
 Sol Smith Russell—Comic stage actor of the late 19th century. Russell Opera House in Brunswick is named for him. (Brunswick)
 Wilbur Sweatman -- Ragtime and Dixieland jazz composer and performer. (Brunswick)
Maxwell D. Taylor - U.S. Army general and diplomat. (Keytesville)

See also
Mormon War (1838)
National Register of Historic Places listings in Chariton County, Missouri

References

Further reading
 History of Howard and Chariton Counties, Missouri (1883) full text

External links
 Digitized 1930 Plat Book of Chariton County  from University of Missouri Division of Special Collections, Archives, and Rare Books

 
Little Dixie (Missouri)
1820 establishments in Missouri Territory
Populated places established in 1820
Missouri counties on the Missouri River